Sunita Agarwal (born 30 April 1966) is a judge of the Allahabad High Court in Uttar Pradesh, India. She has authored several significant judgments in Indian law, including a notable ruling on the jurisdiction of the Allahabad High Court. In addition, Justice Agarwal also gained public attention after the 2020 Zhenhua data leak revealed she was one of 30 Indian judges who were subject to mass surveillance by a Chinese data analytics company.

Life and education 
Justice Agarwal earned a Bachelor of Laws from Awadh University in 1989.

Career 
Justice Agarwal enrolled with the Bar Council of Uttar Pradesh in 1990, and practiced law in Allahabad before being appointed an additional judge of the Allahabad High Court on 21 November 2011. She became a permanent judge of the court on 6 August 2013, and is expected to retire on 29 April 2028. She currently sits on the Allahabad Bench of the High Court.

Judgeship
In 2018, Justice Agarwal, along with another judge, Naheed Ara Moonis, was appointed a member of a panel to hear complaints concerning sexual harassment at the Allahabad High Court. The panel was appointed in compliance with the provisions of the Sexual Harassment of Women at Workplace (Prevention, Prohibition and Redressal) Act, 2013.

As a judge, Mrs. Agarwal has co-authored a number of significant rulings in Indian constitutional law. In May 2020, she and two other judges established the principle that the High Court of Allahabad could exercise jurisdiction over persons who lived outside their jurisdiction, if the case concerned a cause of action that took place within their jurisdiction. The case established the legal principle that residence cannot be the determining factor in the High Court's exercise of jurisdiction.  In March 2020, she was part of a five-judge bench of the Allahabad High Court which established the principle that persons applying for anticipatory bail could directly approach the High Court, and did not need to go through ordinary criminal courts, in 'special circumstances'.

In June 2020, Justice Agarwal and another judge released persons arrested by the Uttar Pradesh police for violation of lockdown regulations during the COVID-19 pandemic in India. The persons in question were arrested while distributing food packets to persons affected by the lockdown, and had been accused of causing 'untoward incidents' and violating social distancing protocols, by the police. Mrs. Agarwal directed the police to raise awareness regarding lockdown protocols as an alternative to arrests and detention.

In September 2020, the Indian Express disclosed that Justice Agarwal was one of 30 judges, as well as several other political leaders, CEOs, sportsmen and women from India, who were being monitored as part of a mass surveillance project by Zhenhua Data, a Shenzhen-based analytics company. The news of the Zhenhua data leak was widely reported, with several Indian newspapers suggesting that Zhenhua Data had close links to the Chinese government, in the context of the 2020 China-India skirmishes.

In February 2021, a single-judge bench of Justice Agarwal noted that the discrimination on the basis of a person's sexual orientation and mention of the same as "indulgence in untoward activity" was in violation of the Supreme Court's landmark 2018 verdict that decriminalised homosexuality and upheld the rights of the LGBT community. In view of the same, Justice Agarwal directed the Home Guard Quarters in Uttar Pradesh to reinstate a staff member belonging to the LGBT community whose appointment was cancelled in light of a video which revealed his sexual orientation.

References 

1966 births
Living people
20th-century Indian lawyers
20th-century Indian women lawyers
21st-century Indian judges
21st-century Indian women judges
Judges of the Allahabad High Court